The Ozone Proton is a French single-place paraglider that was designed by hang gliding and paragliding world champion pilot Robbie Whittall and produced by Ozone Gliders of Le Bar-sur-Loup. It is no longer in production.

Design and development
The Proton was designed as a competition glider. The initial version was later replaced by the Proton GT in production. The GT incorporated a partially closed leading edge, with 20 partially closed and 10 cells fully closed. The models are each named for their relative size.

Operational history
Reviewer Noel Bertrand described the Ozone series of gliders in a 2003 review as, "wings that are both pleasant to fly and high performance in their respective categories".

Variants

Proton
Proton S
Small-sized model for lighter pilots. The glider model is DHV 2-3 and AFNOR certified.
Proton M
Mid-sized model for medium-weight pilots. The glider model is DHV 2-3 and AFNOR certified.
Proton L
Large-sized model for heavier pilots. The glider model is DHV  2-3 and AFNOR certified.

Proton GT
Proton GT S
Small-sized model for lighter pilots. The glider model is DHV 2-3 and AFNOR certified.
Proton GT M
Mid-sized model for medium-weight pilots. The glider model is DHV 2-3 and AFNOR certified.
Proton GT L
Large-sized model for heavier pilots. The glider model is DHV  2-3 and AFNOR certified.
Proton GT XL
Extra large-sized model for even heavier pilots. The glider model is DHV  2-3 certified.

Specifications (Proton GT M)

References

External links
Proton official website
Proton GT official website

Proton
Paragliders